The Daihatsu engines are varieties of automobile engines that used mainly for Daihatsu's own vehicles, Toyota, Perodua and numerous brands around the world.

A

The Daihatsu A-series engine is a range of 0.55 L to 0.62 L compact inline-two petrol engines.

C

The Daihatsu C-series engine is a range of 0.84 L to 1.0 L inline-three petrol and diesel engines.

D
The Daihatsu D-series is a series of water-cooled OHV 8-valve inline-four swirl chamber diesel engines.

DE
Displacement: 2270 cc
Bore and stroke: 83.3 mm x 104.0 mm
Power output: 63 PS @3600rpm
Applications:
Daihatsu DO13T
Daihatsu D200
Daihatsu Light Bus (SV22N/SV27N)

DG
Displacement: 2530 cc
Bore and stroke: 88.0 mm x 104.0 mm
Compression ratio: 21.0:1
Power output: 62-75 PS @3300-3500rpm
Torque output: 135-172 N.m @2200-2400rpm
Applications:
Daihatsu D300
Daihatsu Delta (DV26/SV18L/SV26/V20/V22/V24)
Daihatsu Light Bus (SV32N/SV37N)
Daihatsu Taft (F50)

DL
Displacement: 2765 cc
Bore and stroke: 92.0 mm x 104.0 mm
Naturally aspirated (DL42/43), turbodiesel (DL50/51), turbodiesel with intercooler (DL52/62)
Power output: 69-115 PS @3400-3800rpm
Torque output: 152-255 N.m @1900-2200rpm
Compression ratio: 21.2:1 
Applications:
Daihatsu Delta (V57/58/82/83)
Daihatsu Rugger (F70/75)
Daihatsu Taft (F60)

Note: There was also available an unnamed 1484 cc water-cooled four cylinder diesel engine with power output 40 PS at 3800 rpm fitted to the 1960-1962 Daihatsu D150 truck, which appeared before the DE engine.

E

The Daihatsu E-series engine is a range of 0.5 L to 1.0 L inline-three petrol engines.

F
The Daihatsu F-series engine is a series of OHV 8-valve water-cooled inline-four engine.

FA
Displacement: 1490 cc
Bore and stroke: 78.0 mm x 78.0 mm
Compression ratio: 8.2:1. 
Power output: 68-70 PS @4800rpm
Torque: 128 N.m @3600rpm
Applications:
 Daihatsu BO/CF/CM
 Daihatsu Delta 1500
 Daihatsu F100/F175/Daihatsu Hi-Line
 Daihatsu Light Bus DV200N/SV151N/SV16N
 Daihatsu V100/150/200

FB
Displacement: 1861 cc
Power output: 80-85 PS @4600rpm
Torque output: 152 N.m
Applications:
Daihatsu CO
Daihatsu Delta 2000
Daihatsu F200
Daihatsu Light Bus DV201N/NR250/NR251/SV20N
Daihatsu V200

FC
Displacement: 797 cc
Bore and stroke: 62.0 mm x 66.0 mm.
39-41 PS @5000rpm & 63.7 N.m @3500 rpm.
Applications: 
Daihatsu Compagno 800
Daihatsu New Line
50 PS @6500 rpm
Application:
Daihatsu Sport Vignale (concept car)

FD
Displacement: 2433 cc
Power output: 95 PS
Applications:
Daihatsu Light Bus DV30N/SV30N/SV35N
Daihatsu V300

FE
Displacement: 958 cc
Bore and stroke: 68.0 mm x 66.0 mm
Single carburettor
Compression ratio: 7.8:1
Power & torque:  at 5500 rpm,  at 4000 rpm
Applications:
Daihatsu Compagno 1000
Daihatsu Consorte 1000 HL/TL/PS
Daihatsu Taft (F10)
Twin-carburretor
Compression ratio: 9.5:1
Power & torque:  at 6500 rpm,  at 4500 rpm
Application:
Daihatsu Compagno Spider/1000GT
Fuel injection (65 PS)
Application:
Daihatsu Compagno 1000GT Injection

R92A/B
Racing engines based from bored up FE engine, the displacement was increased from 958 cc to 1261 cc with new 78.0 mm bore size from FA engine. This new engine was known as R92A and used for powering the 1965-1966 Daihatsu P3 and 1967 Daihatsu P5 race cars. The cylinder head was also modified from 8-valve OHV to 16-valve DOHC, an extremely rare configuration at that time.

In 1968, the engine displacement was increased again to 1298 cc with new bore and strokes of 78.5 mm x 67.1 mm and also renamed to R92B.

H

The Daihatsu H-series engine is a series of SOHC 16-valve inline-four water-cooled petrol engine, ranging from 1.3 L to 1.6 L.

J

The Daihatsu J-series engine is a series of inline-four engines, which was fitted with a twin scroll turbo and intercooler in the Copen, that was specially developed for Daihatsu's kei cars in combination with Yamaha.  It was produced from August 1994 to August 2012.

This was the first and last inline-four engine for Daihatsu's kei cars, debuted in the Daihatsu Mira L502 that was launched in September 1994.  The Second Generation Copen uses the KF-DET turbocharged I3, a Daihatsu K-series engine.

K

The Daihatsu K3/KJ/KSZ engine is a series of 1.0 L to 1.5 L inline four petrol engines.

KF

The Daihatsu KF engine is a series of 658 cc inline-three cylinder DOHC 12 valve water-cooled engine, designed for kei cars. This engine replacing the old EF series engines.

KR

A 996 cc inline-three cylinder engine series designed and produced by Daihatsu (also by Toyota as 1KR-FE), applied in numerous Daihatsu Global A Segment Platform and DNGA city cars.

NR

A series of inline-four DOHC engine with Dual VVT-i, ranging from 1.2 L to 1.5 L. Even though this engine is part of Toyota's engine family, but there are two versions of this engine family. The Daihatsu version is built at Daihatsu plant in Indonesia (also by Perodua in Malaysia) and using lower cost low carbon steel material and labelled with "VE" code (a code for Daihatsu engines with VVT-i), while the Toyota version is using more expensive aluminium alloy material and labelled with "FE" code (Toyota's code for narrow-angle DOHC engine with fuel injection).

1NR-VE
Displacement: 1.3 L (1,329 cc)
Bore x Stroke: 72.5 mm × 80.5 mm
Compression Ratio: 11-11.5:1
Maximum Power: 95-97 PS @ 6000rpm
Maximum Torque: 121 N⋅m @ 4000-4200rpm
Applications:
Daihatsu Xenia/Toyota Avanza
Perodua Bezza
Perodua Myvi/Daihatsu Sirion (M800)

2NR-VE
Displacement: 1.5 L (1,496 cc)
Bore x Stroke: 72.5 mm × 90.6 mm
Compression Ratio: 10.5-11.5:1
Maximum Power: 104 PS @ 6000rpm
Maximum Torque: 136 N⋅m @ 4200rpm
Applications:
Daihatsu Terios/Toyota Rush/Perodua Aruz
Daihatsu Xenia/Toyota Avanza
Perodua Myvi (M800)

3NR-VE
Displacement: 1.2 L (1,197 cc)
Bore x Stroke: 72.5 mm × 72.5 mm
Compression Ratio 10.5:1
Maximum Output: 88 PS @ 6000rpm
Maximum Torque: 108 N⋅m @ 4200rpm
Applications:
Daihatsu Ayla / Toyota Agya / Toyota Wigo (B100)
Daihatsu Sigra / Toyota Calya

Single Cylinder
A series of Daihatsu water-cooled single cylinder 4-stroke engines, used for three-wheeled trucks.

GK
Displacement is 736 cc and power output is 14.5 PS.
Daihatsu SK
Daihatsu SSR

GT
Displacement is 744 cc, bore and stroke is 95.0 mm x 105.0 mm, compression ratio is 4.8:1, Power output is 15.8 PS at 3500 rpm and torque 38 Nm at 2000 rpm.

V-Twin
A series of OHV air-cooled 90° v-twin cylinder  engines used in various Daihatsu vehicles in 1930s to early 1960s.

2HA
The Daihatsu 2HA engine is a horizontal engine that was developed for Daihatsu Bee (1951-1952).

The 2HA engine was available in two version, 540 cc and 804 cc.

GLA
Displacement is 751 cc, bore and stroke is 75.0 mm x 85.0 mm, compression ratio is 6.5:1, power output is 25 PS @3800rpm and torque is 52 N.m @3000rpm.
Daihatsu PF
Daihatsu PL7
Daihatsu SKC

GMA
Displacement is 1135 cc and power output is 35 PS.
Daihatsu BF/BM
Daihatsu CM/CO
Daihatsu PM
Daihatsu RKM
Daihatsu UM

GOB
Displacement is 1477 cc, bore and stroke is 97.0 mm x 100.0 mm, compression ratio is 6.3:1, power output is 45-53 PS.
Daihatsu RKO
Daihatsu UO
Daihatsu Vesta

732 cc
Daihatsu FA

854 cc
Daihatsu SKD

1005 cc
Power output is 30 PS.
Daihatsu RKF
Daihatsu SSH
Daihatsu UF

1431 cc
Daihatsu SX/SSX

WA

WA-VE 

An inline-three cylinder engine series designed and produced by Daihatsu.

Displacement: 1.2 L (1,196 cc)
Bore x Stroke: 73.5 mm × 94.0 mm
Compression Ratio: 12.8:1
Maximum Power: 88 PS @ 6,000 rpm
Maximum Torque: 113 N⋅m @ 4,500 rpm
Applications:
Daihatsu Rocky / Toyota Raize / Subaru Rex (A200) (2021–present)
Daihatsu Ayla / Toyota Agya (A350) (2023–present)

WA-VEX 
Displacement: 1.2 L (1,196 cc)
Bore x Stroke: 73.5 mm × 94.0 mm
Compression Ratio: 12.8:1
Maximum Power: 82 PS @ 5,600 rpm
Maximum Torque: 105 N⋅m @ 3,200 – 5,200 rpm
Applications:
Daihatsu Rocky e-Smart Hybrid / Toyota Raize Hybrid (A200) (2021–present)

Z
The Daihatsu Z-series engine is a series of Daihatsu's two-stroke petrol engines.

ZA
Production years: 1957-1962
Single cylinder
Air-cooled
Single carburettor
Total displacement: 249 cc
Bore x stroke: 65.0 mm × 75.0 mm
Maximum output:  at 3600-4000 rpm
Maximum torque:  at 2400-2500 rpm
Compression ratio: 6.2:1
Application: Daihatsu Midget (DK/DS/MP/MP2)

ZD
Production years: 1959-1971
Single cylinder
Air-cooled
Single carburettor
Total displacement: 305 cc
Bore x stroke: 72.0 mm x 75.0 mm
Maximum output: 12 PS @4500rpm
Maximum torque: 21.6 N.m @2500rpm
Compression ratio: 6.2:1
Application: Daihatsu Midget (MP3/MP4/MP5)

ZL
Production years: 1960-1966
Inline-two cylinder
Air-cooled
Single carburettor
Total displacement: 356 cc
Bore x stroke: 62.0 mm × 59.0 mm
Maximum output: 17-21 PS @5000rpm
Maximum torque: 27.4 Nm @3000rpm
Compression ratio: 9.0:1
Applications:
Daihatsu Hijet (L/S35)

ZM series

ZM
Production years: 1966-1981
Inline-two cylinder
Water-cooled
Single carburettor
Total displacement: 356 cc
Bore x stroke: 62.0 mm × 59.0 mm
Maximum output: 23-24 PS @5000rpm
Maximum torque: 34.3 N.m @4000
Compression ratio: 9.0:1
Applications:
Daihatsu Hijet (L36/S36/37/38)
Daihatsu Fellow (L37)

ZM4
Production years: 1970-1972
Inline-two cylinder
Water-cooled
Single carburettor
Total displacement: 356 cc
Bore x stroke: 62.0 mm × 59.0 mm
Maximum output: 33 PS @6500rpm
Maximum torque: 36.2 N.m @5500
Compression ratio: 9.0:1
Applications:
Daihatsu Fellow Max (L38)

ZM5
Production years: 1970-1972
Inline-two cylinder
Water-cooled
Dual carburettor
Total displacement: 356 cc
Bore x stroke: 62.0 mm × 59.0 mm
Maximum output: 40 PS @7200rpm
Maximum torque: 40.2 N.m @6500
Compression ratio: 11.0:1
Applications:
Daihatsu Fellow Max SS (L38)

ZM6
Production years: 1970-1972
Inline-two cylinder
Water-cooled
Single carburettor
Total displacement: 356 cc
Bore x stroke: 62.0 mm × 59.0 mm
Maximum output: 26 PS @5500rpm
Maximum torque: 34.3 N.m @4500
Compression ratio: 9.0:1
Applications:
Daihatsu Hijet (S37)
Daihatsu Fellow Buggy (L37PB)

ZM12
Production years: 1972-1976
Inline-two cylinder
Water-cooled
Single carburettor
Total displacement: 356 cc
Bore x stroke: 62.0 mm × 59.0 mm
Maximum output: 31 PS @6000rpm
Maximum torque: 36.2 N.m @5000
Compression ratio: 9.0:1
Applications:
Daihatsu Fellow Max (L38)

ZM13
Production years: 1970-1972
Inline-two cylinder
Water-cooled
Dual carburettor
Total displacement: 356 cc
Bore x stroke: 62.0 mm × 59.0 mm
Maximum output: 37 PS @6500rpm
Maximum torque: 40.2 N.m @6000
Compression ratio: 9.0:1
Applications:
Daihatsu Fellow Max SS (L38)

References

Automobile engines
Engines by maker
Daihatsu engines